This page lists events in order of increasing probability, grouped by orders of magnitude. These probabilities were calculated given assumptions detailed in the relevant articles and references. For example, the probabilities of obtaining the different poker hands assume that the cards are dealt fairly.

References 

Probability
Probability